At the 1904 Summer Olympics, a water polo tournament was contested, three club teams of seven players each entered. A German team tried to enter, but its entry was refused because the players did not play for the same club. The event took place in a pond in Forest Park, the location of both the Olympics and the World's Fair. Previously, the International Olympic Committee and International Swimming Federation (FINA) considered the water polo event at the 1904 Olympics as a demonstration sport. However, in July 2021, after accepting the recommendation of Olympic historian Bill Mallon, the IOC recognized water polo along with several others as an official sport of the 1904 Olympic program.

Medal summary

References

Sources
 PDF documents in the LA84 Foundation Digital Library:
 Official Report of the 1904 Olympic Games (download, archive)
 Water polo on the Olympedia website
 Water polo at the 1904 Summer Olympics (men's tournament)
 Water polo on the Sports Reference website
 Water polo at the 1904 Summer Games (men's tournament) (archived)

 
1904 Summer Olympics events
1904 Summer Olympics
1904 in water polo
1904